Clutterbuckganj railway station (station code: CBJ) is a railway station on the Lucknow–Moradabad line located in the C.B. Ganj neighbourhood of Bareilly in Uttar Pradesh, India. It is under the administrative control of the Moradabad Division of the Northern Railway zone of the Indian Railways.

Three trains (Two Passenger / One Express) stop at the station.

Gallery

References

Moradabad railway division
Railway stations in Bareilly